Andrei Viktorovich Korabeinikov (born April 1, 1987) is a Kazakhstani professional ice hockey player who is currently playing for Dizel Penza of the Supreme Hockey League (VHL).

Korabeinikov made his Kontinental Hockey League debut playing with Metallurg Novokuznetsk during the 2009–10 KHL season.

International
Korabeinikov competed in the 2012 IIHF World Championship as a member of the Kazakhstan men's national ice hockey team.

References

External links

1987 births
Living people
Barys Nur-Sultan players
Kazakhstani ice hockey defencemen
Kazzinc-Torpedo players
Metallurg Novokuznetsk players
Rubin Tyumen players
Sportspeople from Oskemen
Toros Neftekamsk players
Yertis Pavlodar players
HC Yugra players